Nitish Chandra Laharry (1892–1964) was an Indian lawyer, social worker and film producer from Kolkata. He was the first person of Asian origin to be elected as the president of Rotary International and was the producer of the first motion picture of Bengal, Bilat Ferat. It was during his presidency that Rotary International started its Youth wing, Interact Club. The Government of India awarded him the third highest civilian honour of the Padma Bhushan, in 1963, for his contributions to society.

Biography 
Nithish Chandra Laharry was born in 1892 in Kolkata, in the undivided Bengal of British India to a school teacher as one of his three sons. His early schooling was in Kolkata, after which he studied at the St. Xavier's College and at the Scottish Church College, from where he obtained his graduate and master's degrees in English literature. Later he also secured a degree in law from the University of Calcutta, winning the J. M. Tagore Medal for Law for academic excellence. During his college days, he was involved in literary activities and was the editor of a literary magazine which had Rabindranath Tagore, the Nobel Prize winner, as one of its contributors. He started his career as a lawyer at the Calcutta High Court and worked for four years, only to abandon the career to turn to film industry. He founded a studio and produced a motion picture about the Bengali diaspora in England, the first motion picture produced in Bengal, Bilat Ferat. An economic depression prompted him to switch to film distribution, and it was during this time he married Bindubala.

Laharry joined the Kolkata chapter of Rotary International in 1926 and became its secretary the same year. His business travels took him to Mumbai in 1935, but he continued his association with Rotary International by becoming a member of the Mumbai chapter, and, on his return to Kolkata in 1939, he rejoined the Kolkata branch and became its president in 1944. The Bengal famine of 1943 had already set in by that time and the organization, under his leadership, set up food canteens and free medical camps for the people affected by the famine. He also served as the vice chairman of the Armed Forces Entertainment during World War II and, after the war, managed disbursement centres for the Government of India. In 1953, he was elected as the second vice president of Rotary International, served as the Rotary Information Counselor during 1955–56, and chaired the Asia Regional Conference, in 1958, at Delhi, which had over 2900 participants from 21 countries, reportedly the largest till then. He was elected as the global president of the organization in 1962, thus becoming the first Asian to hold the position. His contributions were also reported behind the founding of Interact Club, the youth wing of the organization.

The Government of India awarded him the third highest civilian honour of the Padma Bhushan in 1963. He was also a recipient of the National Order of Merit (France) and Order of Merit (Chile) and honorary doctorates from California College of Medicine and Baylor University, Texas. He died on 21 July 1964, survived by his two daughters; his wife had preceded him in death. Rotary Club of Kolkata honoured him by naming their children's library as Nitish Chandra Laharry Children's Library.

Filmography 
 1921 : Bilat Ferat

See also 
 Rotary International

References 

Recipients of the Padma Bhushan in social work
1892 births
1964 deaths
Bengali Hindus
20th-century Bengalis
Indian social workers
20th-century Indian lawyers
Indian lawyers
Film producers from Kolkata
Rotary International leaders
St. Xavier's College, Kolkata alumni
Scottish Church College alumni
University of Calcutta alumni
20th-century Indian educators
Social workers from West Bengal
Social workers
Scholars from Kolkata
Bengali lawyers
Educators from West Bengal